The 2022 Parkour World Championships are the inaugural Parkour World Championships. Originally scheduled for 2020 and delayed due to the COVID-19 pandemic, they are being held from October 14 to 16, 2022, in Tokyo, Japan.

History 
The first FIG Parkour World Championships were originally scheduled to take place at Hiroshima on 3–5 April 2020, but postponed as a result of the COVID-19 pandemic.

References

External links 
 Parkour.sport

World Parkour Championships
Parkour
Parkour
International sports competitions hosted by Japan
Sports competitions in Tokyo
Parkour